Adrian Nelson-Daniels (born August 25, 1990), better known by his stage name Adrian Daniel, is an American contemporary R&B singer, songwriter, and producer from Brooklyn, New York of African descent. Daniel has released one EP and three albums: Fool (2014), Disillusions (2016), FLAWD (2018) and Nightwolf (2020). Daniel's music is described by BET and Okayplayer as Neo-Soul.

Early life 
Daniel was born and grew up in East Flatbush and Brownsville, Brooklyn. He attended Boys and Girls High School and later transferred to Brownsville Academy. Daniel refers to his experience growing up as influencing his music.

Career 
In September 2014 Daniel signed a record deal releasing his first official single from the FKKKING HIGH EP with Tommy Boy Entertainment. In February 2016, Daniel released "Devoted". In June 2016, Daniel released his first LP, Disillusions. In 2018, Daniel released FLAWD In 2020, Daniel released Nightwolf.

Discography

References 

American rhythm and blues singers
Tommy Boy Records artists
Living people
1990 births